Shirui Lily Festival is an annual cultural state festival of Manipur organised by Manipur Tourism Department every year. Initially, the festival was celebrated by the locals of Shirui village in Ukhrul to pay tribute to the state flower Shirui Lily that blooms from the last week of May through the second week of June. In 2017, Shirui Lily Festival was declared as a state festival by the Government of Manipur.

Festival locations 
After being declared as a state festival, three venues were selected to celebrate the festival. 
 Ukhrul 
 Shirui
 Hungpung

Main Attractions
The four day festival showcases cultural events, artifacts, games, music and food of Manipur state in general and particularly that of the Tangkhul Naga tribe. The main attractions of the festival are:
ShiRock where rock bands from across the country competes for best rock music title. The event also features international bands to perform mainly on the opening and closing nights.
ShiChef where chefs compete to showcase their cooking skills and recipes.
Miss Spring Pageant where maidens walk the ramp to win the Miss Lily or Miss Spring title.

References

Cultural festivals in India
Entertainment events in India
Festivals in Manipur